Alan Keith Pringle (born January 20, 1952) is a former American football placekicker who played in the National Football League for one season. He played college football at Rice.

Professional career
Pringle was selected by the Houston Oilers in the tenth round of the 1975 NFL Draft, but never played for the team. He saw action in one game with the Detroit Lions during the 1975 season.

References

External links
 Pro Football Archives bio

1952 births
Living people
American football placekickers
Rice Owls football players
Detroit Lions players
English players of American football
Venezuelan players of American football
People from Falcón